The 1885–86 season was the third to be played by the team that are now known as Bristol Rovers, and their second playing under the name Eastville Rovers.

Season review
As with their first two seasons, Eastville Rovers continued to play only friendly matches during the 1885–86 season. A new blue-and-white hooped shirt with white shorts was adopted this year, replacing the original black and gold kit, and it was first worn during a truncated match against Bristol side Right Against Might on 17 October 1885. Only 40 minutes of play was possible in this game due to poor light – Right Against Might had failed to arrive at the ground until 5:10pm, not long before sunset.

The Boxing Day fixture away to St George was also a shortened affair, with the game being abandoned after just 20 minutes due to one of the home team's players suffering a broken leg. With the score standing at 1–0 to St George, Mr E. Fleming attempted to kick the ball, but missed and instead his shin hit a Rovers player's knee. The sound of Fleming's leg breaking was reportedly heard 60 yards away. A benefit match was played for Fleming four weeks later between a combined Warmley and St George XI and a Bristol & District representative side. The game, played in difficult conditions on a partially frozen pitch, ended 2–0 to Warmley & St George.

Where results are known, Rovers ended the season with three wins, a draw and two defeats, but they played at least nine other games on top of these.

Results

In addition to these games there were also matches played against Bristol Wagon Works, Cardiff, Melksham and Wotton-under-Edge, the dates, venues and results of which are not known.

References

Bibliography

Bristol Rovers F.C. seasons
Eastville Rovers